Sibley Lake may refer to:

Sibley Lake (Minnesota), a lake
Sibley Lake Dam, Louisiana
Sibley Lake, North Dakota National Natural Landmark   
Sibley Lake National Wildlife Refuge, North Dakota